Duhemia is a monotypic moth genus of the family Noctuidae erected by Charles E. Rungs in 1942. Its only species, Duhemia variegata, was first described by Daniel Lucas in 1932. The species is found in Morocco.

References

Acontiinae
Monotypic moth genera